Wawanesa Insurance—officially The Wawanesa Mutual Insurance Company, also known as Wawanesa Mutual or simply Wawanesa —is a Canadian mutual insurance firm, as well as among Canada's ten largest property and casualty insurers.

The company's head office is located in Wawanesa, Manitoba, with its executive office in Winnipeg and regional offices across Canada; it also operates in the U.S. states of California and Oregon. As of 2020, it has assets of over $11.3 billion and over two million policies in force.

Wawanesa Insurance wholly-owns 3 subsidiaries: Wawanesa Life, its life insurance subsidiary; Wawanesa General, its American subsidiary; and Trimont Financial Ltd., which provides direct support to local brokers. Wawanesa Insurance and its subsidiaries compose a corporate group called The Wawanesa Group of Companies.

History
The Wawanesa Mutual Insurance Company was established on September 25, 1896, as a farmers' mutual insurance carrier in Wawanesa, Manitoba. It was founded by Alonzo Fowler Kempton, who started the company using money invested by local farmers. After two weeks, Charles Kerr, Alonzo's partner, completed the company's first policy, insuring a thresher for $600 at a premium of $24 for three years.

A small room was rented above a local drugstore. The staff consisted of Kempton as the secretary-manager, and Charles Kerr as the bookkeeper. Seven of the 20 original investors were named directors. Wawanesa issued its first policies without a premium payment because farmers did not have cash until after harvest.

In 1901, Wawanesa moved to the Souris River valley, and the number of employees increased to five. By 1910, the company had become the largest mutual fire insurance company in the country. Several years later, the company diversified its coverage in 1926 to include private buildings, and in 1928 to automobiles.

The company was subsequently granted a Dominion charter on 1 May 1929, allowing it to offer coverage in all provinces of the Dominion of Canada.

During the Great Depression, Wawanesa expanded, fuelled by large cash reserves and new offices in Vancouver, Toronto, Montreal, Winnipeg, and Moncton; however, the company was forced to cut director's salaries by 20%, and on corporate visits, the company directors shared beds.

Wawanesa Mutual Life Insurance Company was introduced as a mutual company in 1961, and sold its first life insurance policy.

In 1975, Wawanesa's United States branch was established under the laws of California, making it the first Canadian general insurance company to successfully enter the US. The office was opened in San Diego in April that year.

On 1 October 1993, the Wawanesa Mutual Life Insurance Company was converted from a mutual company to a wholly-owned stock subsidiary of the general insurance company, with its name changed to The Wawanesa Life Insurance Company.

In the year 2000, Wawanesa began offering automobile insurance in the U.S. state of Oregon.

In 2016, Wawanesa Insurance signed a multi-year sponsorship deal with the Canadian Hockey League, Ontario Hockey League, and Quebec Major Junior Hockey League to become their Official Auto/Home Insurance Company.

On July 1, 2017, Wawanesa completed the purchase of Western Financial Group, Inc and Western Life Assurance from Desjardins Financial Corp via its subsidiary, Trimont Financial. Western Financial Group is a full service brokerage, serving most of Western and Northwestern Canada. Western Life Assurance was later rolled into The Wawanesa Life Insurance Company.

In 2020, Wawanesa opened a head office for the San Diego location, although they also write automobile policies in the state of Oregon. Also that year, Wawanesa opened a claims office in the state of Colorado.

Wawanesa Life 
The Wawanesa Life Insurance Company, or Wawanesa Life, is the life insurance arm of Wawanesa Insurance. It is licensed in all provinces of Canada, as well as in the Northwest Territories.

The company was introduced in 1961 as the Wawanesa Mutual Life Insurance Company, a mutual company. On 1 October 1993, the company was converted into a wholly-owned stock subsidiary of Wawanesa Insurance, with its name changed to The Wawanesa Life Insurance Company.

References

External links
 

Financial services companies established in 1896
Insurance companies of Canada
Mutual insurance companies
1896 establishments in Manitoba
Companies based in Manitoba
Companies based in Winnipeg
Financial services companies based in Manitoba